Saint-Yrieix-la-Perche is a commune in the Haute-Vienne department, region of Nouvelle-Aquitaine, France.

It is significant as the first place where kaolin was found in France, a discovery of great importance to French porcelain manufacturers.

Its name refers to Saint Yrieix (Aredius).  Inhabitants are known as Arédiens. Saint-Yrieix-la-Perche station has rail connections to Brive-la-Gaillarde and Limoges.

Population

See also
Communes of the Haute-Vienne department

References

Communes of Haute-Vienne